Anna Harriett Drury (also Harriet, 1824–1912) was an English novelist who wrote "conventional romances, with a few sharp observations on the role of unattached women in their relatives' houses". She also published poetry and other novels, some marked as intended "for boys".

Life
Anna Drury's birth is recorded in the 1901 census return as in 1824 in Harrow, Middlesex. Her father, Rev. William James Joseph Drury, and her grandfather, Rev. Mark Drury, had both taught at Harrow School, but they left sizeable debts when they withdrew in 1826. Through this Harrow connection, Drury became friends with Anthony Trollope, who later helped her in her literary work.

Drury's father then became chaplain to King Leopold I of Belgium. While in Brussels, Anna Drury first met Frances Trollope, with whose family the Drurys were friendly. By then Anna Drury knew Greek and some Hebrew. She had begun creative writing as a child.

After a period in London, Anna Drury moved to Torquay in 1866, where she became a close friend of Frances Mary Peard. The 1901 census return gives as her occupation "living by her own means (author)". She and two probable sisters of hers, Jane Emily and Sarah Frances, were boarders in a house that may have belonged to Thomas and Jane Tothill, who are also listed as resident there.

Anna Harriett Drury never married. She died in Newton Abbot in June 1912.

Writings
Drury's "conventional romances" and other works included Annesley, and other poems (1847), Friends and Fortune, a moral tale (1849), Light and Shade: or, the Young Artist. A tale (1853), Misrepresentation (1859), The Story of a Shower (1872), Gabriel's Appointment (1877), Called to the Rescue (1879) and In the Enemy's Country; or, the Raven of Steinbrück. A story of 1813, etc. (1891) Some are marked as "for boys".

Numerous books of Drury's are available in facsimile reprints, secondhand original editions, and as free downloads.

In The Normans: or, Kith and Kin (1870), the heroine pointedly asks her father, "What becomes of clergymen's daughters when their fathers die, and their homes are broken up?"

Partial list of works
Friends and Fortune: A Moral Tale, 1 vol., London: William Pickering, 1849
Eastbury: A Tale, 1 vol., London: William Pickering, 1851
Light and Shade: or, The Young Artist, A Tale. 1 vol., London: William Pickering, 1853
The Blue Ribbons: A Story of the Last Century, 1 vol., London: Kerby and Son, 1855
Misrepresentation: A Novel, 2 vols, London: John W. Parker, 1859
Deep Waters: A Novel, 3 vols, London: Chapman and Hall, 1863
The Brothers: A Novel, 2 vols, London: Chapman and Hall, 1865
The Three Half-Crowns: A Story for Boys, 1 vol., London: SPCK, 1866
Richard Rowe's Parcel: A Story for Boys, 1 vol., London: SPCK, 1868
The Normans: or, Kith and Kin, 2 vols, London: Chapman and Hall, 1870
The Story of a Shower: A Novel, 2 vols, London: Bentley, 1872
Ellen North's Crumbs, 1 vol., London: SPCK, 1873
Furnished Apartments, 3 vols, London: Bentley, 1875
Gabriel's Appointment: A Novel, 3 vols, London: Bentley, 1877
Called to the Rescue, 3 vols, London: Bentley, 1879
In the Enemy's Country: or, The Raven of Steinbrück. A Story of 1813, 1 vol., London: Griffith and Farran, 1891

References

1824 births
1912 deaths
19th-century English novelists
English women novelists
Writers from Torquay
19th-century English women writers